The 2011 National Women Football Championship was the 7th season of the National Women Football Championship, the top-tier of women's football in Pakistan. The tournament ran from 18 to 30 September 2011.

Young Rising Stars were able to defend their title and win their third National Championship by beating Diya 4-3 on penalties in the final, after the match had ended 1-1.

Teams 
A total of 15 teams took part in the tournament.

 Azad Jammu and Kashmir
 Balochistan
 Balochistan United
 Diya
 Higher Education Commission
 Islamabad
 KPK
 Margala WFC
 Model Town WFC
 Pakistan Army
 Punjab
 Sindh
 Sports SCN
 WAPDA
 Young Rising Stars

References

National Women Football Championship seasons
W1
W1
Pakistan
Pakistan